Nathan Brown may refer to:

 Nathan Brown (poet) (born 1965), American poet, writer and singer
 Nathan Brown (missionary) (1807–1886), American religious leader
 Nathan J. Brown (political scientist) (born 1958), political scientist & academic
 Nathan Brown (rugby league, born 1973), Australian rugby league player and coach 
 Nathan Brown (rugby league, born 1993), Australian rugby league player
 Nathan Brown (writer) (born c. 1974), Australian, also editor
 Nathan Brown (American football) (born 1986), American football quarterback
 Nathan Brown (cyclist) (born 1991), American cyclist
 Australian rules footballers:
 Nathan Brown (Australian footballer, born 1976), former player for Melbourne 
 Nathan Brown (Australian footballer, born 1978), former player for Richmond and the Western Bulldogs
 Nathan Brown (Australian footballer, born 1988), former player for Collingwood and St Kilda
 Nathan Clifford Brown (1856–1941), American ornithologist
 Nathan Brown (West Virginia politician) (born 1979), American politician